Etz Chaim Synagogue is a synagogue in Portland, Maine. Located at 267 Congress Street, it is the only immigrant-era European-style synagogue remaining in Maine. It was founded in 1921 as an English-language synagogue, rather than a traditional Yiddish-language one. Gary S. Berenson presides as Rabbi of the congregation.

The building also houses the Maine Jewish Museum.

References

External links
 Etz Chaim Synagogue Website  
 Open approach begins to fill Portland synagogue's seats Portland Press Herald, October 4, 2003
 A Portland synagogue begins a renovation Moving ahead by looking backward and reaching out ; The Etz Chaim Synagogue will have a museum of Jewish life, and welcome immigrant communities. Portland Press Herald (Portland, ME) December 14, 2009

1921 establishments in Maine
Jews and Judaism in Portland, Maine
Jewish organizations established in 1921
Religious buildings and structures in Portland, Maine
Synagogues in Maine